Florin Constantin Costea (born 16 May 1985) is a Romanian professional footballer who plays as a striker for Muscelul Câmpulung.

Club career

Universitatea Craiova

Costea started in the Romanian Liga II for the local team Rarora Râmnicu-Vâlcea, then he transferred to one of the most popular teams in Romania Universitatea Craiova, who competed at the time in the same league.

After his new team was promoted, he became one of their key players and one of the best strikers of the Liga I. The 2008/09 season was great for Florin, finishing the top scorer of the Romanian first division, together with Gigel Bucur after both had scored 17 goals.

On 21 March 2010, while playing a match against Politehnica Iaşi, the opposing goalkeeper made a rash challenge on Florin Costea, injuring him. He was forced to leave the pitch, and realising the severity of his injury he was taken out in tears. It was later discovered that he had broken his Medial collateral ligament and Cruciate ligament. He was sidelined for 8 months.

After Universitatea Craiova was disaffiliated he became a Free Agent.

Steaua București

On 3 August 2011 Florin Costea moved to Steaua București on a free transfer, later signing a 4-year contract, worth around €300,000 per year. Here he rejoined his brother Mihai Costea.

Statistics

Statistics accurate as of match played 21 December 2014

Honours

International career 
Since 2008 he gathered six selections in the Romania national football team.
His first selection was courtesy to an injury of Romanian star attacker Adrian Mutu.

Personal life 
He is the older brother of Mihai Costea.

References

External links
 
 
 

1985 births
Living people
People from Drăgășani
Romanian footballers
Romania international footballers
Association football forwards
SCM Râmnicu Vâlcea players
FC U Craiova 1948 players
FC Steaua București players
CS Turnu Severin players
CFR Cluj players
FC Arsenal Tula players
ACS Viitorul Târgu Jiu players
Russian Premier League players
Liga I players
Liga II players
Romanian expatriate footballers
Expatriate footballers in Russia